Kevin Brian Bishop (born 18 June 1980) is a British actor, comedian and writer. He is best known for his roles as Jim Hawkins in Muppet Treasure Island, Stupid Brian in My Family, and Nigel Norman Fletcher in the 2016 revival of Porridge, and as star of The Kevin Bishop Show, which he co-wrote with Lee Hupfield.

Life and career

Bishop's first role was in Grange Hill. His second role, at age 16, was as Ben Quayle in Silent Witness. He played Stupid Brian in three episodes of My Family. He starred in Muppet Treasure Island as Jim Hawkins. In 2002, he played Dick in the pantomime, Dick Whittington.

In 2005, he portrayed the late comedian Dudley Moore onstage in Pete and Dud: Come Again, a drama charting Moore's turbulent relationship with Peter Cook, which debuted at the Assembly Rooms as part of the Edinburgh Fringe before transferring to The Venue in London's West End in March 2006. In August 2007 he appeared as the title character in Channel 4's satirical spoof documentary "Being Tom Cruise", a spin-off of Star Stories. In September 2014, Bishop appeared in the one-man show Fully Committed at the Menier Chocolate Factory, in which he played forty characters. 

In 2013, Bishop appeared in the American comedy series Super Fun Night, written by and starring Australian comedic actress Rebel Wilson. The show ran for one season.

In August 2016, Bishop starred in the revival of classic 1970s BBC sitcom Porridge. He played the role of Fletch, grandson of Ronnie Barker's original main character, locked up for cyber-crime. Originally a one-off, the show was commissioned to full series in October 2016. The first series was broadcast in October 2017 on a 6-week run on BBC One as well as the full series being released at the same time on BBC iPlayer.

In 2016, Bishop played Nigel Farage in a one-off BBC Two comedy series entitled Nigel Farage Gets His Life Back.

In 2017, Bishop became the speaking voice for 2-D, fictional lead singer of British virtual band Gorillaz.

Selected filmography

Awards and nominations

References

External links

BBC Interview
Interview with Kevin Bishop, myparkmag.co.uk
Interview, EcranLarge.com, 6 July 2005

1980 births
English male child actors
English male comedians
English comedy writers
English male film actors
English male musical theatre actors
English male stage actors
English male television actors
English television writers
Living people
People from Orpington
Male actors from London
Musicians from Kent
Male actors from Kent
British male television writers